Kony or KONY may refer to:

Geography
 Kóny, a village in Győr-Moson-Sopron county, Hungary

People
 Joseph Kony (born 1961), a Ugandan guerrilla leader
 Kony Ealy (born 1991), American football player

Films
 Kony (film), an award-winning Bengali film about the triumph of a swimmer and her coach
 Kony 2012, a film about Joseph Kony's war crimes

Companies
 KONY (FM), a country music radio station in Cedar City, Utah
 Kony, Inc., a cloud-based mobile app provider in Austin, Texas

Other
 Kony language, a dialect of the Sabaot language

See also
 Coney (disambiguation)